The commune of Mugina is a commune of Cibitoke Province in north-western Burundi. The capital lies at Mugina.
In 2007, DGHER electrified two rural villages in the commune.

References

Communes of Burundi
Cibitoke Province